Mashgiri (also Romanized as Māshgīrī; also known as Mushgari, Mūshgīrī, and Mūsh Gīrī) is a village in Qaleh-ye Khvajeh Rural District, in the Central District of Andika County, Khuzestan Province, Iran. At the 2006 census, its population was 167, in 30 families.

References 

Populated places in Andika County